Jean Dasque (9 June 1919 – 28 June 2013) was a French film director, active between 1960 and 1984.

Filmography
Cinesumac
Ballon Vole (1960)
Die Johos (1966)
Ohrid Express (1965)
Le Viol (1973)

References

External links 

1919 births
2013 deaths
Film directors from Paris